Antoniabreen is a glacier in Wedel Jarlsberg Land at Spitsbergen, Svalbard. The glacier has a length of about twelve kilometers and a width of two kilometers, and is located east of Martinfjella. The glacier is named after Maria Antonia of Parma.

References

Glaciers of Spitsbergen